Kamel Ait Daoud (born 18 May 1985) is an Algerian rower. He competed in the men's lightweight double sculls event at the 2008 Summer Olympics. He represented Algeria at the 2020 Summer Olympics in the Men's Lightweight Double Sculls with partner Sid Ali Boudina. They finished in 17th place.

References

External links
 

1985 births
Living people
Algerian male rowers
Olympic rowers of Algeria
Rowers at the 2008 Summer Olympics
Place of birth missing (living people)
Competitors at the 2019 African Games
African Games bronze medalists for Algeria
African Games medalists in rowing
Rowers at the 2020 Summer Olympics
21st-century Algerian people
20th-century Algerian people